A discharge in United States bankruptcy law, when referring to a debtor's discharge, is a statutory injunction against the commencement or continuation of an action (or the employment of process, or an act) to collect, recover or offset a debt as a personal liability of the debtor. The discharge is one of the primary benefits afforded by relief under the Bankruptcy Code and is essential to the "fresh start" of debtors following bankruptcy that is a central principle under federal bankruptcy law. Discharge is also believed to play an important role in credit markets by encouraging lenders, who may be more sophisticated and have better information than debtors, to monitor debtors and limit risk-taking. 

A discharge of debts is granted to debtors but can be denied or revoked by the court based on certain misconduct of debtors, including fraudulent actions or failure of a debtor to disclose all assets during a bankruptcy case.  Some debts, such as alimony and child support, cannot be discharged in bankruptcy, while others, such as student loans, are difficult to discharge and are therefore rarely discharged.

The benefit of the discharge injunction is narrower than (but similar to) the benefit afforded by the automatic stay in bankruptcy.

U.S. law also provides for specialized discharges in bankruptcy (see below).

Bankruptcy discharge for the debtor

In the United States, there are generally seven kinds of debtor discharges in bankruptcy, found in the following statutes:

 (relating to liquidation bankruptcies for individuals);

 (relating to municipal bankruptcies);

 (relating to discharges resulting from confirmation of a Chapter 11 plan of reorganization);

 (relating to certain family farmer or fisherman cases);

 (relating to certain family farmer or fisherman cases);

 (relating to certain cases involving adjustment of debts of an individual with regular income);

 (relating to certain cases involving adjustment of debts of an individual with regular income).

For more information on the debtor's discharge, see Bankruptcy in the United States.

Other discharges in bankruptcy

At the conclusion of a case the trustee (if any) may be discharged as trustee under .

References

United States bankruptcy law
Insolvency